In Greek mythology, Antiope (Ancient Greek: Ἀντιόπη derived from αντι anti "against, compared to, like" and οψ ops "voice" or means "confronting") was the daughter of the Boeotian river god Asopus, according to Homer; in later sources she is called the daughter of the "nocturnal" king Nycteus of Thebes or, in the Cypria, of Lycurgus, but for Homer her site is purely Boeotian. She was the mother of Amphion and Zethus.

Myth

Her beauty attracted Zeus, who, assuming the form of a satyr, rapes her. A.B. Cook noted that her myth "took on a Dionysiac colouring, Antiope being represented as a Maenad and Zeus as a Satyr". This is the sole mythic episode in which Zeus transforms into a satyr. Being pregnant with Zeus's child, Antiope feared the wrath of her father, Nycteus, and fled to Sicyon, where she married Epopeus. After this she was carried off by Epopeus, who was venerated as a hero in Sicyon; he would not give her up till compelled by her uncle Lycus. Lycus pursued Antiope after his brother Nycteus committed suicide because of Antiope's disgrace.

On the way home she gave birth, in the neighbourhood of Eleutherae on Mount Cithaeron, to the twins Amphion and Zethus, of whom Amphion was the son of the god, and Zethus the son of Epopeus. Both were left to be brought up by herdsmen. At Thebes Antiope now suffered from the persecution of Dirce, the wife of Lycus, but at last escaped towards Eleutherae, and there found shelter, unknowingly, in the house where her two sons were living as herdsmen. This is the situation in Euripides' Antiope, which turns upon the recognition of mother and sons and their rescue of her.

Here she was discovered by Dirce, who had come to celebrate a Bacchic festival; she ordered the two young men to tie Antiope to the horns of a wild bull. They were about to obey, when the old herdsman, who had brought them up, revealed his secret, and they carried out the punishment on Dirce instead, for cruel treatment of Antiope, their mother, who had been treated by Dirce as a slave. In Euripides, the descent of Hermes stops the brothers from putting their uncle to death; Lycus then resigns power in the Cadmeia of Thebes to the twins.

For the treatment of Dirce, it is said, Dionysus, to whose worship she had been devoted, visited Antiope with madness, which caused her to wander restlessly all over Greece until she was cured, and married by Phocus of Tithorca, on Mount Parnassus, where both were buried in one grave.
 
Amphion became a great singer and musician after Hermes taught him to play and gave him a golden lyre; Zethus was a hunter and herdsman. Amphion and Zethus are said to have established the fortifications of Thebes. For Greeks of the Classical age, the contrast between the lifestyles of the two became the most salient element in the narrative; in Euripides' Antiope the best-recalled scene was where the two brothers in debate contrasted their active and contemplative lives. Together they built and fortified Thebes, huge blocks of stone forming themselves into walls at the sound of Amphion's lyre. Amphion married Niobe, and killed himself after the loss of his wife and children. Zethus married Aedon, or sometimes Thebe. The brothers were buried in one grave.

In Greek culture
At Sicyon, Antiope was important enough that a chryselephantine cult image was created of her and set up in the temple of Aphrodite. Pausanias speaks of it. Only one priestess, an elderly woman, was permitted to enter the cella of the temple, with a young girl chosen each year, to serve as Lutrophoros.

Euripides' Antiope, presented about 408 BCE, was widely quoted, in Plato's Gorgias and many other authors, resulting in a large array of fragments. In 1890 Flinders Petrie discovered further papyrus fragments, which had been reused in constructing a 3rd-century BCE Ptolemaic mummy case found in the Fayoum; the palaeography suggested that the scroll was old before it was reused as waste, making these fragments the earliest surviving text of any Greek play; the discovery occasioned a rash of new readings of the existing fragments. The modern comprehensive reconstruction of all the fragments is that of Jean Kambitsis, ed. and commentator, L'Antiope d'Euripide (Athens, 1972).

Parallels
The myth of Amphion, the legendary founder of Thebes, and Antiope inspired a lot of other similar myths in several areas of Greece. Amphion was son of Zeus and of Antiope, daughter of the Boeotian river god Asopus. The myth took a Dionysiac colour because Zeus was transformed into a satyr in a sole mythic event and Antiope into a maenad. After this she was carried off by Epopeus in Sicyon, where he was venerated later as a hero in the temenos of Athena. Burkert notices the similarity with the myth of Athena Polias and Erechtheus in Athens.

Returning to Thebes, on Mount Cithaeron she gave birth to the twins Amphion, son of the god, and Zethus, son of the mortal Epopeus. The story is mentioned in fragments of the Hesiodic Catalogue of Women (frr. 182, 183) and Asius of Samos (fr. 1). Other twins of similar dual parentage are the Greek Dioscuri who often appear as snakes, protecting the temples. Amphion, the founder of Thebes, became a great singer and musician with a golden lyre, and huge blocks of stone formed themselves into the walls of Thebes, the city with the seven gates. His brother Zethus became a hunter and a herdsman and the two brothers represent the contrast between two different lifestyles. In Euripides' tragedy Antiope they contrasted in debate their active and contemplative lives.

Dionysos, to whose worship Antiope was devoted, visited her with madness, causing her to wander restlessly all over Greece until she was cured. This myth is similar to that of Io, a priestess of the goddess Hera in Argos who was stung by a gadfly and wandered in madness to Egypt. Her sons Cadmus and Danaos returned to Greece, where they became kings of Thebes and Argos.

See also
List of rape victims from ancient history and mythology

References

External links 
 
 Warburg Institute Iconographic Database (ca 40 images of Antiope)

Children of Asopus
Mortal women of Zeus
Princesses in Greek mythology
Mythological rape victims
Theban characters in Greek mythology